Anderson Silva da Paixão (born 5 March 1998), simply known as Anderson, is a Brazilian footballer who plays as a goalkeeper for Cruzeiro.

Career statistics

Honours
Athletico Paranaense
Campeonato Paranaense: 2020

References

External links
 

1998 births
Living people
Brazilian footballers
Association football goalkeepers
Campeonato Brasileiro Série B players
Campeonato Brasileiro Série C players
Sociedade Esportiva Palmeiras players
Centro Sportivo Alagoano players
Santa Cruz Futebol Clube players
Club Athletico Paranaense players
Clube Náutico Capibaribe players
Cruzeiro Esporte Clube players
Brazil youth international footballers